Andrew Brian McGowan (born 1961) is an Australian scholar of early Christianity and an Anglican priest. He is McFaddin Professor of Anglican Studies at Yale Divinity School and dean and president of the Berkeley Divinity School at Yale.

Prior to appointment at Berkeley and Yale he was the seventh warden of Trinity College (University of Melbourne) (2007–2014) and Joan F. W. Munro Professor of Historical Theology in the Trinity College Theological School, Melbourne within the University of Divinity.

Early life and education
McGowan was born on 17 August 1961 in Melbourne, moving to Perth as a teenager. He attended Christ Church Grammar School in Perth and was an early member of the music group that became the Triffids. He then studied classics and ancient history at the University of Western Australia (BA Hons 1983). He studied theology at Trinity College (BD Hons 1986) in Melbourne. After ordination he served a curacy in Como/Manning before appointment as rector of Forrestfield in 1988. He then undertook doctoral studies in Christianity and Judaism in Antiquity at the University of Notre Dame in Indiana, United States (MA, PhD, 1996), where he was supervised by Harold W. Attridge. His thesis was titled "To Gather the Fragments: The Social Significance of Food and Drink in Early Christian Ritual Meals", and published in revised form by the Clarendon Press at Oxford in its Oxford Early Christian Studies series as Ascetic Eucharists: Food and Drink in Early Christian Ritual Meals.

Career
On his return to Australia in 1996, McGowan was lecturer in New Testament and Early Christianity at the University of Notre Dame Australia in Fremantle. In 1998 he was appointed assistant professor in Early Christian History at the Episcopal Divinity School in Cambridge, Massachusetts, being promoted to associate professor in 1999.

He returned to Trinity College as director of its theological school in 2003. After serving as acting warden in 2005 and 2006, he was appointed seventh warden of Trinity College in January 2007. In October 2012, he was elected one of the 10 foundation professors of the MCD University of Divinity, Australia's first specialist university. During this time he was a member of the chapter (i.e., canon) of St Paul's Cathedral, Melbourne, and a clerical member of the General Synod of the Anglican Church of Australia.

In July 2014, McGowan returned to the United States to succeed Joseph H. Britton in the post of dean and president of the Berkeley Divinity School at Yale and Associate Dean for Anglican Studies at Yale Divinity School. He was also appointed J. L. Caldwell McFaddin and Rosine B. McFaddin Professor of Anglican Studies by the president and fellows of Yale University from July 2014.

McGowan was editor of the Journal of Anglican Studies from 2013 to 2020.

Research
McGowan's research interests centre on ancient Christianity, especially the Eucharist, sacrifice, food and meals in antiquity, early North African Christianity, and on Anglican theology. He has also been a commentator on aspects of higher education and religion in contemporary society, including in the Washington Post, USA Today, The Age, The Australian, The Conversation, ABC's The Drum, the news column of the Biblical Archaeology Society called "Bible History Daily" and SkyNews. He is a Christian socialist.

Select publications
 Seven Last Words: Creation and Cross (Portland, Or.: Cascade), 2021.
 Ancient and Modern: Anglican Essays on the Bible, the Church, and the World (Portland, Or. and Melbourne, Australia: Wipf & Stock, and Morning Star), 2015.
 Ancient Christian Worship: Early Church Practices in Social, Historical, and Theological Perspective (Grand Rapids: Baker Academic, 2014). Also published in Italian translation as Il Culto Cristiano dei Primi Secoli (Bologna: Dehoniane, 2019)
 Method and Meaning: Essays on New Testament Interpretation in Honor of Harold W. Attridge, ed. Andrew B. McGowan and Kent Harold Richards (Leiden: Brill, 2012)
 God in Early Christian Thought: Essays in Memory of Lloyd G. Patterson ed. Andrew B. McGowan, Tim Gaden, and Brian E. Daley (Leiden: Brill, 2009).
 Ascetic Eucharists: Food and Drink in Early Christian Ritual Meals (Oxford: Clarendon, 1999)

See also

 Anglican Diocese of Perth

References

External links
 Blog on theology, Anglican affairs and early Christianity

1961 births
20th-century Australian Anglican priests
21st-century Australian Anglican priests
21st-century Anglican theologians
21st-century Australian male writers
Anglican socialists
Australian Anglican theologians
Australian Christian socialists
Christian socialist theologians
Living people
People educated at Christ Church Grammar School
People educated at Trinity College (University of Melbourne)
Academic staff of the University of Melbourne
University of Notre Dame alumni
University of Notre Dame Australia people
University of Western Australia alumni
Yale Divinity School faculty
Yale University administrators
University of Divinity alumni
Academic journal editors